21st-Century Soldier (Czech: Voják 21. století) is a Czech Future Soldier military project. The agreement of Czech Ministry of Defence and VOP-026 Šternberk about the future soldier program was signed in 2004.

Main features
 Lethality
 C4I capability
 Increased survival capability
 Mobility

Subsystems

Weapon system
The rifle, machine gun, sniper rifle of soldier's choice with modular CCD/IR system, laser rangefinder and digital compass mounted on the weapon and connected to the soldier's FCS. This system is supposed to improve the soldier's fire accuracy and ability to quickly share enemy coordinates with friendly soldiers thanks to a radio datalink and GPS receiver.

C4I
This subsystem gives the ability to receive, transmit, process and save data. This subsystem contains communication devices and a miniaturized computer. The communication system is used for data and voice communication with other soldiers or vehicles. Squad leaders will be equipped with two radio stations and one wide touch screen.

Outfit
The clothing will decrease visible and infrared signatures and will include a light-weight ballistic protection vest, a mask and suit protective against weapons of mass destruction, eye protection against lasers, laser illumination warner, reconnaissance radar and health status sensors.

Helmet
The helmet will include a small display and a helmet-mounted night vision camera. The display is used to display IR/CCD picture from weapon or helmet cameras, digital maps, to display positions of friendly and enemy forces or computer interface and video or photos.

Project progress
A functional prototype was created at the end of 2005. The final system is supposed to enter service in 2012.

Proposed military equipment
Military of the Czech Republic
Future soldier programs